The HC Eppan Pirates are an ice hockey team in Eppan, Italy. They play in the Serie A, the top level of ice hockey in Italy. The club was founded in 1981. They are currently named HC Südtirol Bank Eppan for sponsorship reasons.

Achievements
Serie A2 champion: 2003, 2010, 2013
Serie B champion: 2002

External links
Official website 

Ice hockey clubs established in 1981
Ice hockey teams in Italy
Inter-National League teams
Sport in South Tyrol
1981 establishments in Italy